Alex Seyfarth (born 20 January 1999) is an Australian professional rugby league footballer who plays as a  and  for the Wests Tigers in the National Rugby League (NRL).

Seyfarth made his NRL debut in 2020.

Background
Seyfarth played his junior rugby league for the Dundas Shamrocks. Seyfarth is of English,Spanish and Sri Lankan descent.

Playing career

2020
Seyfarth made his debut in round 3 of the 2020 NRL season for the Wests Tigers against the Cronulla-Sutherland Sharks following the resumption of the sport due to the COVID-19 pandemic.

2021
On 27 July, it was announced that Seyfarth would be ruled out for an indefinite period after suffering a MCL injury.
Seyfarth played a total of 12 games for the Wests Tigers in the 2021 NRL season as the club finished 13th and missed the finals.

2022
Seyfarth played a total of 17 matches for the Wests Tigers in the 2022 NRL season as the club finished bottom of the table and claimed the Wooden Spoon for the first time.

References

External links
Wests Tigers profile

1999 births
Living people
Australian people of Italian descent
Australian rugby league players
Rugby league players from Sydney
Rugby league second-rows
Western Suburbs Magpies NSW Cup players
Wests Tigers players